Archdeaconry of Montgomery is an archdeaconry within the Diocese of St Asaph. It covers the eastern area of Montgomeryshire and includes  Welshpool, Newtown, and Llanfyllin. Originally part of the Archdeaconry of Powys, which dated from the Medieval period. The Archdeaconry of Powys was reconstituted by an Order in Council in 1844, when it was split into the Archdeaconry of Montgomery and  the Archdeaconry of St Asaph. In recent years the Archdeacon has lived in 17th century half-timbered Vicarage at Berriew.

Archdeacons
Former Archdeacons include:
 William Clive 1848–1861, Vicar of Welshpool 1819–1865. He was the son of William Clive MP, who was the brother of Sir Robert Clive
Henry Powell Ffoulkes 1861–1886, Rector of Whittington, Oswestry, 1879–1886
1886-1916: (d.) David Thomas (Archdeacon of Montgomery). Rector of Llandrinio. A notable Church historian. 
1916–1925: (res.): Grimaldi Davis
1925–1938: (d.): Ellis Griffith
1938–1944: (ret.): Evan Thomas
1944–1951: (d.): John Lloyd
1952–1959: William A Jones
1959-1966: William Williams
1966–1976: Elidyr Glynne Jones
1977–1987: Owen Thomas
1987-1998: Bill Pritchard (priest). Vicar of Berriew. Author of many books on the local history of NW Wales.
1998–2002: David Griffith
2002–2012: John Thelwell
2012–2018: Peter Pike
7 October 2018present: Barry Wilson

References

Montgomeryshire
Church in Wales